Sand star is a common name for several starfish (sea stars) and may refer to:

Astropecten, a genus containing species known as sand stars
Luidia, a genus containing species known as sand stars